Taylorsville High School is a public high school established in 1981, located in Taylorsville, Utah, United States. The principal is Mrs. Emily Liddell.  The mascot is the Wilbur the Warrior. The current enrollment is around 2,900 students  and represents many different ethnic groups. Taylorsville High is one of eight high schools in Granite School District.
Taylorsville High is located in the central part of the Salt Lake Valley and was built in 1981 to serve the growing population of the Taylorsville area. School boundaries are roughly Jordan River to 3100 West and 4100 South to 6600 South (excluding the area between 4500 S and 4700 S and approximately Jordan River and 950 W).

Taylorsville has immense pride in its history and continues to strive to improve, grow, and excel academically. Taylorsville has successful programs for AVID (Advancement Via Individual Determination), JROTC and Latinos in Action, along with large AP program.

Administration

Current administration 
 Mrs. Emily Liddell – principal
 Emily Liddell assumed the position of principal on March 5, 2018 after Dr. Garrett Muse was appointed Director of High School Accountability for the Granite School District.
 Mr. Jami Hutchins – assistant principal
 Mr. Jordan Kjar – assistant principal
 Mrs. Kelli Miller- assistant principal
Mr. Brian Murray – assistant principal

Past principals 
 Dr. A. Earl Catumull (1981–1986)
 K. Wendall Sullivan (1986–1988)
 Michael B. Cannon (1988–1993)
 Dr. David Gourley (1993–2003)
 Jerry Haslam (2003–2010)
 Dr. Garett Muse (2010–2018)

Academics

Advanced Placement 
Taylorsville High offers nineteen different Advanced Placement courses along with several Honors courses in core subjects.  Advanced Placement courses are created by the College Board and offer college-level material and exams to high school students. Students may receive course credit at colleges and universities across the country if they earn a high score on the exam.

Taylorsville also offers Concurrent Enrollment (CE) classes; these are college-level classes that are offered to juniors and seniors, in which students can earn both high school and college credit at the same time. Concurrent Enrollment classes are taught by Taylorsville faculty who have been approved by Salt Lake Community College or Utah Valley University as adjunct faculty members. Concurrent enrollment credit can be transferred to most state colleges.

AVID 
Taylorsville has a large AVID program, and was recognized as an AVID Highly Certified Site for 2017–18. AVID is an in-school academic support program that helps prepare students for college, by teaching them skills needed to succeed in college. AVID places academically average students in Honors, CE, and AP classes, and then provides support to help the student see success in these more advanced classes. The AVID program continues to have a 100% college acceptance rate, meaning every AVID senior has been accepted into a college or university.

ROTC 
In January 1994, Taylorsville High was approved to offer a JROTC program to students. Taylorsville's JROTC program has earned the Unit of Distinction Award seven out of eight years possible. The program teaches students the Army values (Loyalty, Duty, Respect, Selfless Service, Honor, Integrity, and Personal Courage), helps students get back on track or stay on track for graduation, and excellent leadership skills to use throughout their life. The original JROTC instructors were Lieutenant Colonel (R) Horton and First Sergeant (R) Heikel, the program is currently under the direction of Lieutenant Colonel (R) Warner and Sergeant First Class (R) Wilson.  The JROTC program is open to all students of Granite School District.

The mission of JROTC is to motivate young people to be better citizens.  A student enrolled in JROTC acquires the title of “cadet” – an officer-in-training.  Designed to prepare cadets for the ever-changing role of being a leader in modern society, the program uses military structure to teach cadets discipline, respect, and how a hierarchy of management levels interacts to accomplish any complex task.  As cadets proceed through the Program they acquire basic life skills, become more physically fit, and develop a sophisticated understanding of government, history, and management.  The Program is more than classrooms and textbooks; it is a hybrid, hands-on enterprise to create a better citizen under the close coaching, counseling, and mentoring of accomplished Army-veteran instructors.  All cadets are encouraged to participate in the extracurricular teams wherein unit cohesion, mutual support, camaraderie, and leadership grow.

This is not a military recruitment program; participation in the JROTC program incurs no obligation or commitment on the part of a cadet to serve in uniform.  Yet students should be aware that completion of the LET-3 or LET-4 course does enable a graduate to enter the military service with the rank of E-2 rather than start as an E-1.

Journalism 
Taylorsville has an established journalism program and has received national awards for the school newspaper, The Warrior Ledger. The American Scholastic Press Association (ASPA) has awarded The Warrior Ledger with top honors, three years in a row.

Career and technical student organizations
The school's reputation for legacy has been demonstrated in competitions in organizations such as FBLA, DECA, FCCLA, and SkillsUSA.

Athletics 
Taylorsville currently competes as a member of Region II as part of the 6A classification, Region II consist of Cyprus, Granger, Hunter, Kearns, Roy, and West. The Athletic Directors are Guy Mackay and Rebecca Elkins. Taylorsville High has won 17 team state championships since 1981, including 10 baseball championships.

State championships 

 1984 4A Boys Golf – State Runner Up: 1983, 1993
 1986 4A Baseball
1987 4A Baseball
1988 4A Volleyball
1989 4A Baseball
 1989 4A Girls Basketball – State Runner Up: 1987, 1988, 2002
 1992 4A Baseball
1993 4A Baseball
1994 4A Baseball
1996 5A Baseball
1997 5A Softball
 1998 5A Baseball
1998 5A Wrestling – State Runner Up: 1994
 23 Individual State Championships have been earned by Taylorsville wrestlers, most notably:
 Craig Stauffer (1985), was the first State Champion in wrestling for Taylorsiville. He went on to a scholarship at Utah State University.  Craig continued his wrestling career as a longtime coach at Hunter High School.
 Justin Ruiz (1996, 1997, 1998), had a long and decorated wrestling career that was highlighted by earning a bronze medal at the 2005 World Championships.  Justin has continued his wrestling career, as a coach.
 Kyle Thornock (2002, 2003)
 Roy Nash (2013, 2014), Named Win Magazine's Wrestler of the Year for the state of Utah in 2013.  Roy was the only state champion in the entire state to go undefeated (41–0) during the 2013 season.  Roy was also ranked #1 in the country in Greco-Roman style wrestling for his age and weight class.
Cheyenne Ruiz (2021, 2022)- First female State Champion.  2021 was the first year that women's wrestling was an official sport in Utah.
 2000 5A Baseball
2000 5A Boys Swimming – State Runner Up: 1995, 1999
 2002 5A Baseball
2007 5A Softball – State Runner Up: 1996, 2008, 2014

Region championships 

 Boys Basketball – 1995, 2002, 2014
 Girls Basketball – 1988, 1989, 1993, 2002, 2012
 Boys Cross Country – 1988, 2001, 2004, 2021, 2022
 Drill – 1995, 2004
 Boys Soccer – 1988, 1989, 1994, 1996, 2002, 2014
 Girls Soccer – 1990, 1992, 2000
 Boys Track – 1989, 2002, 2003, 2004
 Girls Track – 2002
 Boys Golf – 1981, 1984, 1993, 1994
 Football – 1999, 2013
 Boys Swimming – 1990, 1991, 1994, 1995, 1996, 2000
 Boys Tennis – 1999, 2021
 Girls Tennis – 2019
Wrestling – 1986, 1989, 1990, 1995, 1996, 1998, 2002, 2003, 2020
 Volleyball – 1984, 1988, 1989, 1992, 1993, 1994, 1996, 1997, 2011, 2012, 2013, 2014
 Softball – 1992, 1997, 2000, 2001, 2002, 2003, 2004, 2005, 2006, 2007, 2008, 2009, 2011, 2012, 2014, 2015
 Baseball – 1984, 1986, 1987, 1988, 1989, 1992, 1993, 1994, 1995, 1996, 1997, 1998, 1999, 2000, 2002, 2003, 2005, 2006, 2008, 2012, 2013, 2014, 2022

Baseball
Since it opened in 1981, Taylorsville has won ten state championships in baseball, more than any other Utah high school in that time period. The baseball state championships were won in 1986, 1987, 1989, 1992, 1993, 1994, 1996, 1998, 2000 and 2002. The most successful head coach was Steve Cramblitt, who won nine championships and 297 games during his tenure at Taylorsville. The Taylorsville player with the most successful baseball career is John Buck. John played in Major League Baseball for 11 years totaling 1090 games, most notably for the Kansas City Royals. John is still active in the Taylorsville baseball community and participates in the annual alumni game.

Student government
The Student Government of Taylorsville High is currently advised by George Curtis and Rebecca Elkins.

The officer corps is made up of eight Student Body Officers, sixteen Class Officers, and sixteen Senators elected during April of each year.  The theme for the 2021-2022 school year is "We Are...".  Each year the student government officers lead the student body in a charity fundraiser.  Recently, the charity was Make a Wish Foundation, through a series of events the Taylorsville community donated over $15,000, in 2021.

Notable alumni
John Buck – MLB catcher, New York Mets (Class of 1998)
Natalie Williams – Gold medalist in the 2000 Olympics, WNBA power forward and 4 time All-Star (Class of 1989)
Brandon Lyon – MLB pitcher, New York Mets (Class of 1997)
Aimee Winder Newton – first female Republican on the Salt Lake County Council (Student Body Vice President '91–92 and Class of 1992)
Lance Scott – NFL center, Arizona Cardinals, New York Giants (Class of 1990)
Mike Winder – former West Valley City Mayor, currently serving in the Utah House of Representative, businessman (Student Body President '93–'94 and Class of 1994)
Justin Ruiz – 2005 Bronze medalist in the Wrestling World Championships (Class of 1998)
Ryne Sanborn – Child of Light, 2002 Winter Olympics; actor; model (Class of 2007)
Megan Joy – contestant on Season 8 of American Idol (Class of 2004)
Christian Colon – MLB shortstop, Kansas City Royals World Series Champion

See also
List of high schools in Utah

References

External links
Information on Taylorsville High School

Public high schools in Utah
Educational institutions established in 1981
Schools in Salt Lake County, Utah
1981 establishments in Utah